Spurrier was originally a person who made spurs. It is now a surname.

Surnames
 Henry Spurrier (1898–1964), British engineer and industrialist
 Junior J. Spurrier, American combat soldier
 Lonnie Spurrier (1932–2015), American middle-distance runner
 Martha Spurrier, British lawyer
 Paul Spurrier (born 1967), British child actor, screenwriter and film director
 Peter Spurrier (1942–2005), officer of arms at the College of Arms in London
 Simon Spurrier, British comics writer and novelist
 Steve Spurrier (born 1945), American football player and coach
 Steven Spurrier (artist) (1878–1961), British artist and painter.
 Steven Spurrier (wine merchant) (born 1941), British wine expert and merchant